Events from the year 1667 in art.

Events

Paintings

 Ludolf Bakhuizen – The Return of the Warship Hollandia in the Landsdiep near Huisduinen on 3 November 1665
 Abraham van Beijeren – Banquet Still Life (with Mouse)
 Ferdinand Bol – Portrait of Michiel de Ruyter
 Rembrandt
The Jewish Bride (approximate date; Rijksmuseum Amsterdam)
Portrait of an elderly man (Mauritshuis)
Johannes Vermeer -Mistress and Maid (c.)

Births
January 12 - Jonathan Richardson, English portrait painter, writer on art and collector (died 1745)
February 4 - Alessandro Magnasco, Italian Rococo painter of genre or landscape scenes (died 1749)
May 2 - Jacob Christoph Le Blon, German painter and engraver who invented the system of three- and four-colour printing (died 1741)
July 21 - Cristoforo Munari, Italian painter of the late-Baroque specializing in still life paintings (died 1720)
September 9 - Felice Torelli, Italian painter of altarpieces (died 1748)
November 5 - Christoph Ludwig Agricola, German landscape painter (died 1719)
December 17 - Jan-Baptist Bosschaert, Flemish painter (died 1746)
date unknown
Federiko Benković, Croatian late baroque painter (died 1753)
Francis Bird, English sculptor (died 1731)
Michael Feuchtmayer, German member of the Feuchtmayer family of Baroque artists (d. unknown)
Jan Kupecký, Czech and Slovak portrait painter (died 1740)
Antoine Rivalz, official painter to the town of Toulouse (died 1735)
Giovanni Tuccari, Italian painter of battle scenes (died 1743)
Cornelis Verelst, Dutch flower painter (died 1734)
Ned Ward, English writer and publican (died 1731)

Deaths
January - Jacob Duck, Dutch painter (born 1600)
February 10 - Juan Bautista Martínez del Mazo, Spanish Baroque portrait and landscape painter (born 1612)
June - Thomas de Keyser, Dutch painter and architect (born 1596)
May 22 - Pope Alexander VII, Papal patron of the arts commissioned architectural and sculptural works by Gianlorenzo Bernini (born 1599)
July 4 - Christiaen van Couwenbergh, Dutch Golden Age painter (born 1604)
August 3 – Francesco Borromini, byname of Francesco Castelli, Swiss-Italian Baroque architect in Rome (born 1599)
August 12 - Cornelius van Poelenburgh, Dutch painter (born 1590)
September 3 - Alonzo Cano, Spanish painter, architect and sculptor (born 1601)
October 24 (buried) - Gabriël Metsu, Dutch painter (born 1629)
December 4 - Michel Lasne, French engraver, draughtsman and collector (born 1590)
date unknown
Mario Balassi, Italian painter of the Baroque period (born 1604)
Orfeo Boselli, Italian sculptor working in Rome (born 1597)
Francisco Caro, Spanish Baroque painter (born 1627)
Ignatius Croon, Flemish Baroque painter (born 1639)
Frans Francken III, Flemish painter (born 1607)
Jerónimo Jacinto de Espinosa, Spanish painter active in Valencia (born 1600)
Luigi Primo, Flemish painter of portraits and altarpieces (born 1705)

 
Years of the 17th century in art
1660s in art